The 2020 Pacific typhoon season was the first with below-average tropical cyclone activity since 2001, with 23 named storms, 10 of which became typhoons and only 2 became super typhoons. This low activity was a consequence of La Niña that persisted from the summer of the year. It had the fifth-latest start in the basin on record, slightly behind 1973, and was the first to start that late since 2016. The first half of the season was unusually inactive, with only four systems, two named storms and one typhoon at the end of July. Additionally, the JTWC recorded no tropical cyclone development in the month of July, the first such occurrence since reliable records began. The season's first named tropical cyclone, Vongfong, developed on May 8, while the season's last named tropical cyclone, Krovanh, dissipated on December 24. However, the season's last system was an unnamed tropical depression which dissipated on December 29. 

The scope of this article is limited to the Pacific Ocean to the north of the equator between 100°E and 180th meridian. Within the northwestern Pacific Ocean, there are two separate agencies that assign names to tropical cyclones which can often result in a cyclone having two names. The Japan Meteorological Agency (JMA) will name a tropical cyclone should it be judged to have 10-minute sustained wind speeds of at least  anywhere in the basin, whilst the Philippine Atmospheric, Geophysical and Astronomical Services Administration (PAGASA) assigns names to tropical cyclones which move into or form as a tropical depression in their area of responsibility located between 135°E and 115°E and between 5°N–25°N regardless of whether or not a tropical cyclone has already been given a name by the JMA. Tropical depressions that are monitored by the United States' Joint Typhoon Warning Center (JTWC) are given a number with a "W" suffix.



Seasonal forecasts

During the year several national meteorological services and scientific agencies forecast how many tropical cyclones, tropical storms, and typhoons will form during a season and/or how many tropical cyclones will affect a particular country. These agencies include the Tropical Storm Risk (TSR) Consortium of University College London, PAGASA and Taiwan's Central Weather Bureau. The first forecast for the year was released by PAGASA on January 22 predicting the first half of 2020, within its monthly seasonal climate outlook. The PAGASA predicts that only 0–4 tropical cyclones are expected to form or enter the Philippine Area of Responsibility between January and March, while 5–8 tropical cyclones are expected to form between April and June. This was due to the fact that the El Niño–Southern Oscillation was seeing neutral conditions across the Pacific, and could persist until midyear. On May 21, the TSR issued their extended-range forecast for 2020, forecasting tropical activity below the average normal, with 26 tropical storms, 15 typhoons and 8 intense typhoons. These numbers were supported by the current values from the Indian Ocean Dipole, the Accumulated Cyclone Energy index and the sea-surface temperatures in the Niño 3.75 region, leading to a stronger than normal trade windspeed throughout much of the Western Pacific.

On June 24, the PAGASA issued a climate forecast, predicting the number of tropical cyclones for the second half of the season. They predicted that 6–10 tropical cyclones are expected to form between the months of July and September, while 4–7 tropical cyclones are expected to form between the months of October and December. On July 9, TSR issued their forecast for the season, predicting a well-below average season with 26 named storms, 14 typhoons and only 7 intense typhoons. On August 6, TSR issued their third and final forecast for the season, lowering their numbers to 21 named storms, 13 typhoons and 5 intense typhoons. They mentioned that the 2020 season is expected to be one of the "least active typhoon seasons on record", with a predicted ACE index barely half of the normal and a 96% probability of being a below-average season.

Season summary

The first few months of 2020 were inactive, with no tropical systems developing until May. On May 8, the season saw its first tropical system with the development of Tropical Depression 01W (Ambo), making it the sixth-latest starting season on record, as well as the latest since 2016. 2 days later, the system strengthened to the first officially named tropical storm of the season, Vongfong. Tropical Storm Vongfong then rapidly intensified into a significant typhoon and struck the central part of the Philippines on May 14, first making its landfall in San Policarpo, Eastern Samar, crossing 4 more islands and then hitting mainland Luzon.

After Vongfong, another month of inactivity ensued, and on June 10, a new tropical depression formed off the coast of Samar, Philippines, and was named Butchoy by the PAGASA a day later. Butchoy made landfall in the Philippines as the JTWC issued a TCFA for it. Once it exited Philippine landmass, Butchoy was upgraded into a tropical depression by the JTWC and all warnings issued by PAGASA were lifted, and Butchoy further intensified into a tropical storm in the South China Sea and was named Nuri by the Japan Meteorological Agency. After Nuri dissipated over mainland China, the basin became quiet again for more than a month with only Tropical Depression Carina forming east of Luzon; this led to the first time that no tropical storms developed within the month of July since reliable records began. The activity in the West Pacific increased somewhat with the formation of Tropical Storm Sinlaku, and the formation and intensification of Hagupit for a typhoon, ending a fast of more than 2 months without any significant typhoon. Hagupit affected China as a mid-Category 1-equivalent storm and caused US$441 million in damage. The storm then transitioned to an Extratropical cyclone and affected North Korea and Russia. A few days later, a new tropical depression formed, and then intensified into Tropical Storm Jangmi. Just southwest of Jangmi, a disorganized low-pressure area formed and would soon become Severe Tropical Storm Mekkhala, reaching China. A few days later, a new tropical depression formed in the South China Sea, and the PAGASA named the system as Helen. Shortly after, Helen intensified into a Severe Tropical Storm Higos, the 7th named storm on the 2020 typhoon season. Higos then went on to hit China. Soon after Higos dissipated, a new system formed in the east of the Philippines, and was named Igme. Igme then went on to become Tropical Storm Bavi and rapidly intensify in the coastal waters of Taiwan. In late August, Typhoon Maysak formed along 
Super Typhoon Haishen, with the systems reached Korean Peninsula and Japan, respectively.

September started with Maysak weakening on its way to Korea, while a new Tropical Storm Haishen formed in the open Pacific, threatening the same areas that Maysak and previously Bavi affected. Typhoon Maysak made landfalls in South Korea and North Korea, while Typhoon Haishen intensified into the first super typhoon of the season. In mid-September, Tropical Storm Noul formed in the South China Sea, made landfall in Vietnam, and dissipated soon after. Later in the month, Tropical Storm Dolphin formed off the east coast of Japan and dissipated after a short life. Near the end of the month, Kujira formed and intensified into a severe tropical storm, before weakening and later becoming extratropical.

October was an extremely active month. The season started out with Typhoon Chan-hom, which lasted for 14 days before dissipating. On October 9, Tropical Storm Linfa formed, becoming the first of a train of tropical systems to affect Vietnam. Linfa killed more than 100 people and caused severe flooding in Vietnam and Cambodia. Nangka formed a few days after Linfa, though impacts were much less. A tropical depression, dubbed Ofel by the PAGASA went through the Philippines and then hit Vietnam, affecting the already flooded areas from Linfa.. After a short lull in systems, Typhoon Saudel formed on October 18, causing flooding in the Philippines. Afterwords, two very powerful typhoons formed after Saudel: Molave and Goni. The former killed 41 people throughout The Philippines, Vietnam, and Malaysia, while the latter became a Category 5-equivalent super typhoon. After Goni, Atsani formed and lashed Northern Luzon and Southern Taiwan as a tropical storm. As Atsani dissipates, another depression formed and affected Visayas as a depression, giving the name Tonyo. The next day, it was upgraded to a tropical storm, earning the name Etau. Etau lasted from November 7 until November 11. On November 8, a depression formed in the Philippine Area of Responsibility and was given the name Ulysses. The next day, it was upgraded to a tropical storm, giving the name Vamco. Vamco strengthened into an equivalent of a Category 2 typhoon as it brushed the Luzon landmass. It quickly exited the Philippine Area of Responsibility the next day as the PAGASA stated that it restrengthened as a typhoon. It rapidly strengthened and reached its peak intensity as a Category 4-equivalent typhoon. It weakened into a Category 1-equivalent typhoon as it approached Vietnam. It weakened further, finally, dissipated north of Laos. At last in the month of December, three systems formed with one named as Krovanh which formed at the South China Sea. Then the season concluded on December 29 with a weak depression close to the coast of Vietnam.

Systems

Typhoon Vongfong (Ambo)

A low-pressure area was first noted on May 9 by the JTWC near Micronesia and was given a medium chance of developing into a tropical cyclone. The following day, the JMA declared that it had developed into a tropical depression to the east of Mindanao, Philippines and was expected to slowly move west. The JTWC then issued a Tropical Cyclone Formation Alert (TCFA) for the system just hours later while convection began to gradually obscure the center. Later that day, the PAGASA followed suit and upgraded the system to a tropical depression, assigning it the name Ambo, as it became the first tropical cyclone to enter their area of responsibility for 2020.

The system began to slowly drift westwards throughout the following days, and on the next day, the JTWC upgraded Ambo to a tropical depression, designating it as 01W. The storm gradually intensified throughout the day and began to turn north. At this time, the JMA upgraded 01W to a tropical storm and assigned it the first name of the year, Vongfong. Shortly after, the JTWC followed and upgraded the system to tropical storm intensity. The PAGASA and JMA would then upgrade the system to a typhoon later in the day, with the JTWC quickly upgrading the system to a Category 2-equivalent typhoon as the eye became clearer. A few hours later, Vongfong intensified to a Category 3-equivalent typhoon. Then, the storm later went an eyewall replacement cycle, quickly finishing the cycle while fluctuating in intensity. At 12:15 pm PST on May 14, Vongfong made its first landfall in San Policarpo, Eastern Samar. Vongfong gradually weakened shortly after, crossing over the Ticao Pass as it moved further inland. By the succeeding day, PAGASA recorded five more landfalls: hitting the islands of Dalupiri Island, Capul Island, Ticao Island, Burias Island, and San Andres, Quezon in Luzon Island's Bondoc Peninsula. Ambo weakened into a Category 1-equivalent typhoon following the landfalls. The system further weakened on May 15, and was downgraded by both the JMA and PAGASA to a severe tropical storm, with the JTWC downgrading it to a tropical storm as well. Vongfong made its seventh landfall on Real, Quezon, further weakening and being downgraded by the JMA and the PAGASA into a tropical storm. The weakening trend continued, and by May 16, Vongfong emerged into the Luzon Strait as a low-end tropical storm. 6 hours later, the JTWC downgraded Vongfong to a tropical depression, and issued their final warning. Soon after, PAGASA and the JMA followed suit as well. The remnants of the storm fully dissipated by May 17, with PAGASA downgrading the storm's remains into a low-pressure area.

In preparation for the incoming typhoon, Tropical Cyclone Wind Signal (TCWS) #3 warnings were issued for Northern Samar and the northern portion of Eastern Samar. According to the NDRRMC, Typhoon Vongfong (Ambo) left ₱1.57 billion (US$31.1 million) worth of damages in agriculture, and left 5 dead, as of May 27. The international name Vongfong and Philippine name Ambo were retired from use by the Typhoon Committee and PAGASA, being replaced with Penha and Aghon respectively.

Tropical Storm Nuri (Butchoy)

On June 10, the JMA began monitoring on a weak tropical depression that had developed to the east of the Philippine island of Samar in Visayas. During the next day, the PAGASA began tracking the system, giving the local name Butchoy. The storm then made its first landfall in Polillo Island in Quezon at 5:30 pm PHT, and making its second landfall in Infanta, Quezon shortly thereafter. Soon after, the JTWC issued a Tropical Cyclone Formation Alert for the storm. Afterwards, the JTWC officially upgraded Butchoy to a tropical depression, and designated it as 02W. With a favorable environment with low vertical wind shear, moderate equatorial outflow and 30–31 °C sea surface temperatures, Butchoy started to intensify in the South China Sea, becoming a tropical storm and receiving the name Nuri from the JMA later on the same day. Then, PAGASA issued their final warning on Nuri as it exited the Philippine Area of Responsibility. Six hours later, the JTWC upgraded Nuri to a tropical storm. However, later in the same day, the JTWC downgraded Nuri into a tropical depression, citing that the storm has drifted into high vertical wind shear. The JMA followed suit, downgrading Nuri into a depression. The JTWC issued their final warning on Nuri as the storm subsequently made landfall in Yanjiang, China. The JMA followed suit six hours later, issuing their final warning on the system.

The PAGASA issued Tropical Cyclone Signal No. 1 for western Mindanao, southern Luzon, and Visayas on June 11 as Butchoy neared the Philippines. The combination of the system and prevailing southwesterly winds brought showers and thunderstorms across the Philippines. Heavy rainfall in Albay led to the activation of disaster risk management officials and other emergency assets. The rains from the tropical depression prompted PAGASA to declare the start of the rainy season in the Philippines on June 12, 2020, which was also during the country's Independence Day. In Hong Kong, Nuri brought heavy rain. One person also drowned due to rough waters.

Tropical Depression Carina

After about one month of inactivity, on July 11, the JMA designated a low-pressure area near Luzon as a tropical depression. The next day, the JTWC designated the depression as an invest and was given a low chance of developing, and later upgraded to a medium chance. On the following day, the PAGASA upgraded the low-pressure system to a tropical depression and named it Carina.

Carina moved north-northwest over an environment favorable for further development, with low vertical wind shear, established equatorial outflow and 28–29 °C sea surface temperatures. By 12:00 UTC on July 14, Carina rapidly weakened into a low-pressure area, due to an unfavorable environment with strong wind shear. PAGASA then issued their final advisory to Carina, and the remnants dissipated on July 15.

As the low-pressure system was named Carina, PAGASA immediately hoisted Signal #1, the lowest of their storm warning signals, to Batanes, Babuyan Islands and the northeastern portion of Cagayan. Heavy rainfall from Carina caused some damage on Ilocos Norte, Abra and Isabela.

Typhoon Hagupit (Dindo)

On July 31, JMA began monitoring a weak tropical depression that had developed in the Philippine Sea. Later, PAGASA later named the depression Dindo. By the next day, the Joint Typhoon Warning Center designated Dindo as 03W. With favorable conditions of low vertical wind shear, strong equatorial outflow and 31 °C sea surface temperatures, Dindo intensified into a tropical storm on midday of the same time, and the Japan Meteorological Agency named it as Hagupit. Hagupit then began intensifying in the Philippine Sea, and by August 2, Hagupit was upgraded into a typhoon by the JTWC. The JMA later upgraded Hagupit to a severe tropical storm late on August 2. As Hagupit exited the Philippine Area of Responsibility (PAR), the PAGASA issued its final bulletin on the system. Hagupit was then upgraded into typhoon status by the JMA on August 3, and will later peak in intensity with a pressure of 975 hPa. At around 19:30 UTC, Hagupit made landfall in Wenzhou, China, with winds of 85 mph and pressure of 975 mbar (hPa). After its landfall, Hagupit gradually weakened over China, and by early August 4, the JTWC downgraded the typhoon into a tropical storm. Around midday of the same day, JTWC downgraded Hagupit into a tropical depression and later issued their final advisories on the storm, but the JMA still monitored Hagupit as a tropical storm. The system later would undergo an extratropical transition, a process which got completed on August 6, and the JMA issued their final advisory on the extratropical Hagupit.

In advance of Hagupit, Chinese officials ordered the evacuation of areas vulnerable to flooding. Hagupit caused torrential rainfall over portions of China peaking at 13.11 inches (333 mm) in the Jingshan district of Wenzhou. 15 people were reported dead across South Korea, 6 of them following a landslide in South Chungcheong Province, 11 people were reported missing, and 7 people were injured.

Tropical Storm Sinlaku

On July 29, a tropical disturbance formed and was situated a couple hundred miles east of Manila, Philippines. Struggling to consolidate, the disturbance crossed Luzon with little to no organization and began organizing in the South China Sea. Environmental conditions became conducive for development, and the JMA declared that a tropical depression had formed in the early hours of July 31. Then early on August 1, the depression intensified into Tropical Storm Sinlaku. The storm failed to intensify much afterward, and during the following day, Sinlaku made landfall on northern Vietnam. Shortly thereafter, both agencies issued final advisories on the storm.

Sinlaku produced heavy rain across central and northern Vietnam, resulting in significant flooding. Two people died, one from a collapsed embankment and the other from flash flooding. Thousands of homes were inundated and crops suffered extensive damage. Damage in the nation was about nearly 5.4 billion đồng (US$232,900). Flash floods across Thailand also killed two people.

The remnants of Sinlaku emerged in the Indian Ocean and intensified into a well marked low-pressure area between August 5–8, recreating a lot of torrential rain in portions of India.

Tropical Storm Jangmi (Enteng)

On August 6, the Philippine Atmospheric, Geophysical and Astronomical Services Administration started to monitor a low-pressure area that developed well east of Virac, Catanduanes. On the next day, the Japan Meteorological Agency designated the low-pressure area as a weak tropical depression. Despite a broad and elongated low-level circulation center, it gradually organized, prompting the Joint Typhoon Warning Center to issue a Tropical Cyclone Formation Alert on the depression.

Early on next day, the PAGASA upgraded it to a depression, naming it Enteng. Later around the same day, the JTWC designated the depression as 05W. But, near end on the same day, the Japan Meteorological Agency upgraded the depression to a tropical storm, receiving the name Jangmi. As such, Jangmi became the fifth named tropical storm of the 2020 typhoon season. On August 9, Jangmi was upgraded into a tropical storm by the JTWC. Despite being at favorable conditions of low vertical shear and 29–30 °C sea surface temperatures, an upper-level low present to the west of the system prohibited the broad Jangmi to organize further. Around the same time, the PAGASA dropped advisories on Jangmi as it quickly exited the Philippine Area of Responsibility. Moving northward at 23 knots, the JMA reported that Jangmi already peaked at 45 knots (50 mph; 85 km/h). Around 05:50 UTC on August 10, Jangmi made landfall on the southern tip of Geojedo, Gyeongsang Province in South Korea. The JTWC issued their final advisories on Jangmi around 15:00 UTC of the same day, and the JMA issued their final advisory early on the next day, August 11.

Jangmi dropped drenching rainfall through the Ryukyu Islands of Japan, with a peak amount of 2.2 inches (55.8 mm) recorded on the island of Kumejima. In South Korea, Jangmi dropped up to 2.6 inches (66.04 mm) of precipitation, in an area already hard hit by flooding in the months previous to Jangmi.

Tropical Depression 06W (Gener)

Due to the fact that the disturbance already had tropical-storm-force winds, it was immediately declared a tropical storm by the JTWC on August 9. The next day, the tropical depression reached its peak intensity of 35 mph with an unusually high pressure of 1012 mbar. Soon afterwards 06W began to gradually weaken, and at 15:00 UTC on August 10, the JTWC downgraded 06W to a tropical depression.

After moving generally westward, the system began to move to the southwest and, at 20:00 UTC (4:00 am, August 13 PST), it entered the Philippine's area of responsibility and was given the name Gener by PAGASA.

Severe Tropical Storm Mekkhala (Ferdie)

Another area of persistent convection formed within the proximity of the trough that would also spawn Tropical Storm Jangmi On August 7, west of Luzon. As Jangmi became the dominant system in the area, this low-pressure area remained disorganized. However, on the next day, as Jangmi moved away from the area, the system began to organize, and on August 9, the JTWC upgraded the storm to a Tropical Depression. Soon after, at 8:00 pm. PST, the PAGASA followed and upgraded the storm and gave it the name Ferdie.  At 07:30 CST on August 11 (23:30 UTC on August 10), Mekkhala made landfall at Zhangpu County in Fujian, China shortly after peak intensity.

Mekkhala forced a Signal No. 1 warning to be placed for the Ilocos region in the Philippines. Mekkhala brought monsoonal conditions to portions of Luzon, shortly after its formation. Although remain well offshore Taiwan, the storm still brought heavy rainfall to the island.

In China, local officials suspended ferry services and told ships to return to port, in preparation for Mekkhala. The China Meteorological Administration issued a Level III emergency response, while flood control workers were sent to areas which were hit by Mekkhala. Mekkhala dropped torrential rainfall over China with amounts of up to 7.874 inches (200 mm) reported in some areas. Train services were halted and flights were canceled at local airports as Mekkhala moved onshore. In Zhangzhou, Fujian, damage from the storm reached 1.1 billion yuan (US$159 million).

Severe Tropical Storm Higos (Helen)

A new tropical depression formed from the Intertropical Convergence Zone east of Luzon on August 16. At 15:00 UTC, the PAGASA named the system Helen and began issuing severe weather bulletins for the tropical depression, but dropped the alerts as Helen left the Philippine area of responsibility after 4 hours.  The Hong Kong Observatory and Macau Meteorological and Geophysical Bureau upgraded Higos into a marginal typhoon prior to landfall, with sustained hurricane-force winds in Macau indicating such an intensity. Higos made landfall over Zhuhai, Guangdong at peak intensity at around 06:00 CST on August 19 (22:00 UTC on August 18).

In preparation for Higos, the Hong Kong Observatory raised the number 9 tropical cyclone warning signal in Hong Kong to warn of the possibility of hurricane-force winds. Winds generally reached gale to storm force over the southern part of Hong Kong under the influence of Higos' small circulation. The Macao Meteorological and Geophysical Bureau issued the number 10 signal, the highest signal, at 05:00 am local time. Over 65,000 people evacuated and schools were closed across these areas. Although heavily populated areas of China were directly hit by Higos, damage was mostly limited to downed trees and power outages. Two campers who were unaware of the approaching storm had to be rescued from Tap Mun Island after arriving on August 14.
The storm also left 7 deaths and 45 billion đồng (US$2 million) in damages in Vietnam.

Typhoon Bavi (Igme)

On August 19, the JTWC began monitoring a broad area of low pressure situated a couple hundred miles northeast of the Philippine archipelago. By the next day, the system rapidly organized, and the JTWC subsequently issued a Tropical Cyclone Formation Alert (TCFA). On August 21, the area of low pressure became Tropical Depression 09W. At 15:00 UTC, the PAGASA named the system Igme and issued a severe weather bulletin for it. By the next day, Igme intensified into a tropical storm, according to the JMA and was given the name Bavi, subsequently prompting the JTWC to follow suit and upgrade 09W from a tropical depression to a tropical storm. Favorable conditions allowed Bavi to rapidly intensify, and by 12:00 UTC on August 22, the system became a severe tropical storm. As the system left the Philippine Area of Responsibility, the PAGASA stopped issuing weather bulletins for the severe tropical storm. Bavi's period of rapid intensification was brief, and it began a slow intensification phase on August 23.

On August 24, Bavi slowly intensified, and it was later upgraded by the JMA into a typhoon. Later on that day, it became a Category 2-equivalent typhoon. By the next day, Bavi intensified even more to become a Category 3-equivalent typhoon. As Bavi moved closer to the Korean peninsula, one person died in Jeju island on August 25. At around 00:30 UTC on August 27, Bavi made landfall over North Pyongan Province, North Korea. After that, Typhoon Bavi transitioned into an extratropical storm in Manchuria, China.

Typhoon Maysak (Julian) 

A low-pressure area east of the Philippines consolidated into a tropical depression on August 27, and simultaneously, a Tropical Cyclone Formation Alert was issued for the system. Early on August 28, PAGASA upgraded it to a tropical depression with the local name Julian, shortly before the JMA upgraded it to a tropical storm and assigned the international name Maysak. Subsequently, the JTWC upgraded Maysak to a tropical storm too, and then the JMA upgraded it to a severe tropical storm despite its elongated low-level circulation center.  and two hours later, PAGASA followed and also upgraded the system to typhoon status. Later on that day, it became a Category 2-equivalent typhoon. By the next day, Maysak intensified even more to become a Category 3-equivalent typhoon. Then later on afternoon, it was upgraded to a Category 4-equivalent typhoon. Soon, Maysak began to weaken bit-by-bit as it passed the East China Sea, 1-minute winds slowing back down to Category 3-equivalent speeds.

After that, it crossed the Sea of Japan and hitting North Korea into Jilin, Manchuria in China. Soon after, Typhoon Maysak degenerated into an extratropical low in northeast China.

On September 2, the Panamanian-registered animal transport ship Gulf Livestock 1 transmitted a Mayday and launched lifeboats, at least one of which was found. The ship was west of Japan's Amami Ōshima Island. The Japan Coast Guard has said that the freighter was carrying a crew including 39 Filipinos, 2 Australians, and 2 New Zealanders when it disappeared. The cargo was 5,867 cattle, loaded in Napier, New Zealand, and bound for the port of Jingtang in Tangshan, China. Two fatalities occurred in South Korea where also 120,000 households lost power. In North Korea, Maysak dropped 15.157 inches (385 mm) of precipitation in Wonsan.

Typhoon Haishen (Kristine)

 By the next day, the disturbance had quickly organized, and the JTWC issued a Tropical Cyclone Formation Alert (TCFA) for the low-pressure area, and by the next day, it intensified into Tropical Depression 11W. Traversing generally southwestward, the depression quickly intensified into a tropical storm.  

Upon entering the Philippine Area of Responsibility (PAR), the Philippine Atmospheric, Geological and Atmospheric Services Administration (PAGASA) named the system Kristine. Early on September 4, the JTWC assessed that Haishen became a Category 4-equivalent super typhoon – with 1-minute sustained wind speeds of 135 kt (155 mph; 250 km/h), with a clear, symmetrical eye visible on satellite imagery. On September 5, as Haishen's latitude increased, the ocean heat content in the area decreased, which disrupted the system's core and caused its eye to appear ragged on satellite imagery, subsequently indicating weakening, and dropping below super typhoon status. Later that day, the system left the PAR and PAGASA issued its last bulletin on the typhoon.

As the system continued its northward track toward the Japanese archipelago, it continued to weaken and became a Category 3-equivalent typhoon, and not too long after it weakened to a Category 2-equivalent typhoon as it neared the Southern Ryukyu Islands of Japan. A mandatory evacuation order was issued for western Japan as millions of people evacuated accordingly. Haishen made landfall in Ulsan, South Korea at around 09:00 KST (00:00 UTC) on September 7, 

Haishen caused two fatalities in Japan, while four others went missing after a mudslide occurred in Miyazaki Prefecture. Two more fatalities occurred in South Korea and widespread flooding occurred in neighboring North Korea.

Tropical Depression 12W

On September 10 at 00:00 UTC, the JMA began tracking a tropical depression. At 15:00 UTC that day, the JTWC issued a Tropical Cyclone Formation Alert on the system. On September 11 at 18:00 UTC, the JTWC upgraded the disturbance to a tropical depression, designating it as 12W; it was downgraded back to a tropical disturbance six hours later. The JMA had stopped tracking the depression by September 13th.

Tropical Storm Noul (Leon)

On September 14 at 12:00 UTC, the JMA began tracking a tropical depression. On the morning of September 15, the JTWC issued a tropical cyclone formation alert for a tropical system forming in the Philippine Sea. The JTWC later upgraded it to a tropical depression at 15:00 UTC as they issued their first warning on the system as Tropical Depression 13W. Since the depression formed inside of the Philippine Area of Responsibility (PAR), the PAGASA immediately issued a severe weather bulletin on the storm and named the system Leon. At 21:00 on September 16, the storm left the PAR and PAGASA issued its final warning on the system. At 03:00 UTC September 18, Noul made landfall between Quảng Trị and Thừa Thiên-Huế provinces. At 09:00 UTC, the JTWC issued its final warning on the system.
After being downgraded to a low-pressure area (LPA), Noul followed a westward path and emerged in the Indian Ocean.

A few days before the storm hit Vietnam, the Vietnamese government closed three airports and evacuated more than one million people in the affected areas. Noul damaged homes and knocked down trees and power lines in Hue, Vietnam. Heavy precipitation amounts peaking at 310 mm (12.20 inches) fell in Da Nang. The storm caused 6 deaths and 705 billion đồng (US$30.4 million) in damage.

Severe Tropical Storm Dolphin (Marce)

On September 20 at 06:00 UTC, as a tropical disturbance strengthened in the extreme northeast corner of the Philippine Area of Responsibility, PAGASA upgraded the system to a tropical depression, giving it the local name Marce. At the time, the JTWC only recognized the system as an area of convection and only issued a medium level of warning for the system. The JTWC upgraded the system to a tropical storm at 12:00 UTC. On September 21 at 03:00 UTC, the system left the Philippine Area of Responsibility. The system then intensified into a tropical storm south of Japan, and was given the international name Dolphin by the JMA. After the storm transitioned into an extratropical cyclone, the JTWC issued its final warning on the system on September 24 at 03:00 UTC.

Severe Tropical Storm Kujira

 The storm drifted north-northwestwards before recurving to the northeast while intensifying into a Category 1-equivalent typhoon early on September 29. Kujira weakened to a tropical storm 12 hours after it intensified into a typhoon due to very high wind shear and cool waters. At 21:00 UTC, the JTWC issued the last advisory for the system.

Typhoon Chan-hom

On October 2, the JTWC began to monitor a large area of thunderstorms in the open Pacific Ocean. The system gradually organized, and it was classified as a tropical depression on October 4. On the next day, the JMA upgraded the storm to a tropical storm and named it Chan-hom. On October 7, the system was upgraded by the JMA into a typhoon. The JMA issued their final warning on the system on October 12 at 00:45 UTC. The JTWC later followed, issuing their final warning on the system at 09:00 UTC. The JMA, however, still tracked Chan-hom as a tropical depression until it was last noted on October 16.

Tropical Storm Linfa

On October 9, the JTWC began tracking a tropical system east-southeast of Da Nang, Vietnam. On October 10, the system was declared as a tropical depression by the JTWC and the JMA. Later that day, the JMA upgraded the system into a tropical storm and named it Linfa. The system continued westward, making landfall on October 11 at 03:00 UTC in Vietnam. The JTWC issued their final warning on the system at 09:00 UTC that day. The JMA later followed, issuing their final warning on the system at 18:00 UTC.

Linfa brought historic amounts of rainfall to Central Vietnam, peaking at 90.16 inches (2,290 mm) in A Lưới (Huế), 59.842 inches (1,520 mm) in Hướng Linh (Quảng Trị). That made it the 12th wettest tropical cyclone in history. At least 370,000 people in Vietnam lost power after the storm. So far the storm and its flood have left 104 people dead and 38 remain missing in Vietnam and Cambodia. In Cambodia, severe flooding affected 16 provinces including Phnom Penh, killed at least 21 people, damaged over 25,000 homes over and over 180,000 hectares of farmland.

Tropical Storm Nangka (Nika)

On October 11, the JMA began tracking a tropical depression off the west coast of Luzon. The PAGASA declared the system as a tropical depression at 12:00 UTC, and since the storm formed inside of the Philippine Area of Responsibility (PAR) the agency named the system Nika. On the same day at 21:00, the JTWC began issuing warnings on the system. On October 12, the system was declared a tropical storm by the JMA, and was named Nangka. At 09:00 UTC, the system left the PAR and the PAGASA issued its final bulletin on the system. At 19:20 CST (11:20 UTC) on October 13, Nangka made landfall over Qionghai, Hainan.

On October 13, the storm crossed the Gulf of Tonkin and made landfall in the Nam Định, Ninh Bình, and Thanh Hóa provinces in Northern Vietnam on October 14. On the same day, both the JMA and JTWC issued their final warnings for the system. The system dissipated on October 14, 2020.

After the passage of Nangka over Hainan Island, 2 people died and 4 are missing as a result of a capsized boat. In Northern Vietnam, the storm killed 2 people in Hòa Bình, another missing in Yên Bái. Over 585 houses were destroyed, while 135,731 others across central Vietnam were flooded.

Tropical Depression Ofel

A low-pressure area formed in the Philippine Sea, east of Leyte, on October 13. Soon, the PAGASA declared the newly formed system as a tropical depression and assigned it the name Ofel. The PAGASA immediately raised warning signals for the province of Sorsogon and for parts of the Samar province. On the same day at 18:30 UTC, Ofel made landfall over Can-avid, Eastern Samar. As the system entered the South China Sea in the early hours of October 15 UTC, the PAGASA lifted all tropical cyclone warning signals for Ofel. On the same day at 20:00 UTC, Ofel left the Philippine Area of Responsibility (PAR) and PAGASA issued their final bulletin for the system. While Ofel was inside the PAR, the Joint Typhoon Warning Center issued tropical cyclone formation alerts for the system, however it was canceled as the system entered a less favorable environment on October 16. The storm dissipated at 03:00 UTC on that day.

Flooding was reported due to moderate to heavy rains. According to the Department of Agriculture Regional Office 5, total damages have topped to an estimated ₱9.1 million (US$187,000).

Typhoon Saudel (Pepito)

On October 18 at 21:00 UTC, the PAGASA upgraded the system into a tropical depression, and named the system Pepito. A few hours later, the JMA also recognized the system into a tropical depression, and subsequently issued their first warning on the system. As the system intensified as it approached Northern Luzon, the JMA upgraded the system into a tropical storm and named the system Saudel. The PAGASA also declared the system as a tropical storm, and began issuing Signal #2 tropical cyclone warnings in preparation for its landfall. Saudel made landfall over the San Ildefonso Peninsula in Casiguran, Aurora on October 20 at 13:00 UTC (21:00 PHT) and began crossing the Luzon Island, emerging over the South China Sea hours later. As the storm left the Philippine Area of Responsibility, the developing severe tropical storm was upgraded into a typhoon by the JMA, the JTWC, and by the PAGASA in their final bulletin for the system.

As of October 24, the NDRRMC reported total damages of about ₱105.8 million (US$2.18 million).

Tropical Depression 20W

On October 19, both the JMA and the JTWC began tracking a tropical depression, with the JTWC designating it as 20W. 20W formed over marginally favorable conditions for development, before turning southwest after originally moving northeastward, encountering strong wind shear. On October 21, the JTWC assessed that 20W was no longer a tropical depression, also assessing that it had transitioned into an extratropical cyclone the next day. The JMA stopped tracking 20W on October 23.

Typhoon Molave (Quinta) 

On the same day, PAGASA followed suit as the system formed inside of the Philippine Area of Responsibility (PAR), east of Mindanao, and named the system Quinta. On October 24, the JTWC also recognized the system as a tropical depression. At 15:00 of the same day, the JTWC upgraded the system into a tropical storm, with the JMA and PAGASA doing the same a few hours apart from each other. Now a tropical storm, the system was named Molave by the JMA. On October 25, PAGASA upgraded the system into a severe tropical storm as it tracked closer to the Bicol Region. Later that day, the PAGASA then upgraded Molave into a typhoon as it headed for Albay and Camarines Sur, prompting the raising of Signal #3 tropical cyclone warnings for both and adjacent provinces. Moments later, the JMA also upgraded the system to a typhoon and the JTWC followed a few hours later. At 18:10 PHT (10:10 UTC), Molave made its first landfall on the San Miguel Island in Albay, with another in Malinao just 40 minutes later. Molave made a total of 5 landfalls in the Luzon area before entering the South China Sea on October 26. On October 27 at 00:00 UTC, Molave left the PAR, with PAGASA issuing their last bulletin for the system later at 15:00. After that, Typhoon Molave intensified even more and peaked as a Category 3-equivalent typhoon in the South China Sea. 

, the NDRRMC reported that 27 people were killed, 40 people were injured and four went missing after the typhoon. Damage from infrastructure and agriculture counted to be ₱1.56 billion (US$32.2 million) and ₱2.66 billion (US$54.9 million) respectively, with a total damage of ₱4.22 billion (US$87.1 million) nationwide. In Vietnam, Molave left 41 dead, 143 were injured and 42 people missing. Economic losses were estimated to be 12.92 trillion dong (US$558 million).

Typhoon Goni (Rolly)

After Typhoon Molave devastated the Philippines, the JMA announced the formation of a new tropical depression in the Pacific Ocean, west of the Mariana Islands, on October 27. By the next day, the JTWC had also followed and upgraded the system into a tropical depression. As the system continued tracking westward under favorable conditions in the Pacific Ocean, the JMA and JTWC upgraded the system into a tropical storm, with the JMA assigning the name Goni to the intensifying storm. Due to the warm waters surrounding the storm, the system underwent rapid intensification and became a typhoon. On October 29, at 9:30 UTC, Goni entered the Philippine Area of Responsibility (PAR) and was named Rolly by the PAGASA. Warm sea surface temperatures, low vertical wind shear and high ocean heat content continually supported Goni as it edged closer to the Philippines, and it maintained its intensity into the next day. Goni made its first two landfalls at peak intensity over Bato, Catanduanes (20:50 UTC) and Tiwi, Albay (23:20 UTC). After that, it weakened into a strong typhoon and made a third landfall in San Narciso, Quezon. Due to three landfalls and land interaction, Goni lost its immense strength and weakened into a minimal typhoon as it made a fourth landfall in San Juan, Batangas. Before exiting the PAR, Goni slightly intensified, but further development was hampered by unfavorable conditions. The capital, Manila, experienced some tropical storm-force winds from Goni.

, the NDRRMC has reported ₱12.9 billion (US$266 million) of infrastructure damages, along with ₱5 billion (US$103 million) of agricultural damage, with a combined total of ₱17.9 billion (US$369 million), and at least 25 deaths, 399 injured and 6 missing. Goni is estimated to have caused at least ₱48.058 billion (US$1.04 billion) in damages in the Philippines.

Severe Tropical Storm Atsani (Siony)

This disturbance would eventually strengthen into a new tropical depression in the early hours of October 29. Later that day, the JMA upgraded the system into a tropical storm. On November 1, at 00:00 UTC, Atsani entered the PAGASA's Philippine Area of Responsibility (PAR), with the PAGASA naming the system Siony. The storm tracked northwest through the Philippine Sea, passing through the Luzon Strait on November 4. The system left the PAR on November 7 at 21:00 UTC. Shortly afterwards, the system rapidly weakened and dissipated thereafter.

Atsani downed trees, caused landslides, and damaged street lights in parts of Taiwan. Rockfalls caused some roads to close in Taitung County. 3 minor injuries were reported within Taitung County in the townships of Haiduan and Jinfeng. The storm brought heavy rains to Batanes and the Babuyan Islands in the Philippines, causing ₱4.9 million (US$101 thousand) in agricultural damage.

Tropical Storm Etau (Tonyo)

At 12:00 UTC on the same day, the PAGASA declared the system as a tropical depression and assigned it the name Tonyo as it formed directly over Burias Island. The Joint Typhoon Warning Center recognized the system as a tropical depression at 15:00 UTC on November 8. Etau caused rains over Calabarzon, Mimaropa, and the Bicol Region before exiting the Philippine Area of Responsibility on November 9 at 21:00 UTC. It continued its way towards Vietnam, after crossing Philippines.

Etau killed two people in Quảng Nam and Bình Định and damaged 400 houses when it made landfall in central Vietnam on November 10. The storm produced over 250 mm (10 in) of rain in the provinces of Bình Định, Khánh Hòa, and Phú Yên, with peak at 858 mm in Lake Thủy Yên (Thừa Thiên Huế). The storm also caused gusty winds which uprooted trees and ripped roofs of buildings, many of which were still recovering from the adverse impacts of Typhoon Molave and the weakened Tropical Storm Goni. In addition, power outages locally affected the city of Tuy Hòa. Economic losses in Tuy An, Phú Yên were counted as 122 billion VND (US$5.26 million).

Typhoon Vamco (Ulysses)

At 12:00 UTC on the same day, the PAGASA declared the system as a tropical depression inside of the Philippine Area of Responsibility and named it Ulysses. The next day at 7:15 UTC, the system strengthened into a tropical storm, with the JMA giving it the name Vamco, with the Joint Typhoon Warning Center later issuing their first warning on the system as a tropical depression.
As the system tracked closer to southern Luzon, both the PAGASA and the JMA upgraded Vamco into a severe tropical storm. Vamco was then upgraded into typhoon status by the JMA on November 11, followed by the JTWC and the PAGASA shortly after, as the PAGASA raised Signal #3 tropical cyclone wind signals in preparation for the storm. At 14:30 UTC and 15:20 UTC, Vamco made its first two landfalls over the island towns of Patnanungan and Burdeos, respectively, both in Quezon Province. Later at 17:40 UTC, Vamco made its third landfall over General Nakar, Quezon, in the Luzon landmass. At 00:00 UTC, the system emerged over the western seaboard of Zambales and entered the South China Sea. The system left the PAR at 01:30 UTC as the PAGASA redeclared the system as a typhoon. Vamco rapidly re-strengthened in the South China Sea and peaked as a Category 4-equivalent typhoon briefly before weakening back into a Category 3-equivalent storm heading for Vietnam. The typhoon then weakened before making another landfall as a Category 1-equivalent typhoon in Vietnam.

As of January 13, 2021, the NDRRMC reported  a total of 196 casualties (Including 101 validated deaths, 85 injuries and 10 missing) caused by the typhoon, along with  worth of agriculture damages and  worth of infrastructural damages. The Cagayan Valley experienced the highest total amount of damage. At least 5,184,824 individuals were affected by the typhoon's onslaught. The Armed Forces of the Philippines and Philippine National Police reportedly rescued 265,339 and 104,850 individuals, respectively. According to Aon, total economic losses caused by the typhoon were estimated to top .

Tropical Storm Krovanh (Vicky)

The PAGASA had already recognized the system as a tropical depression and named it Vicky, however at the time, the Japan Meteorological Agency (JMA) only recognized the system as a low-pressure area. The next day, the JMA followed suit and recognized the system as a tropical depression. At 14:00 PHT (6:00 UTC), the system made landfall in Baganga, Davao Oriental. 9 hours later, it emerged off the coast of Misamis Oriental and entered the Bohol Sea, later entering the Sulu Sea on the next day at 5:00 PHT (23:00 UTC). On December 19 at 23:00 PHT (15:00 UTC), Krovanh made its second landfall over central Palawan, emerging into the South China Sea shortly after. As the storm traversed the South China Sea, the system had strengthed into a tropical storm according to the JMA as it emerged into a region of relatively favorable atmospheric conditions, thus given the name Krovanh. On December 20 at 14:00 PHT (6:00 UTC), Krovanh left the Philippine Area of Responsibility, although storm signals were still raised for the Kalayaan Islands. The PAGASA then upgraded Krovanh into a tropical storm, and issued a Signal No. 2 warning for the Kalayaan Islands. The next day, December 21, Krovanh was downgraded into a tropical depression by both the JMA and by the PAGASA in their final advisories for the storm. The JTWC then issued their final warning on Krovanh the next day shortly after most of its central convection had dissipated due to increasingly hostile wind shear.

Large swaths of Visayas and Mindanao were placed under Signal No. 1 warnings due to Krovanh. Floods and landslides were triggered in Cebu, Agusan del Sur, Davao de Oro, and in Leyte, where two senior citizens were killed in a landslide. In Lapu-Lapu City, 300 residents were forced to evacuate after 76 houses near the shore were swept into sea. Around 6,702 individuals were affected by the storm in the Philippines, with 5,646 in evacuation centers. Damages have been estimated to total up to ₱213.2 million (US$4.48 million). At least eight people were killed by the effects of Krovanh.

Other systems
 
Late on July 27, the JMA began to track a weak tropical depression in the open Western Pacific. Later on the following day, the system was unofficially classified as a subtropical depression by the JTWC, having been given a low chance of transitioning to a tropical cyclone. In a marginal environment with cyclonic easterly flow, moderate to strong wind shear and 28–30 °C sea surface temperatures, the system was expected to recurve poleward and be absorbed by a larger extratropical low. The depression, however, dissipated on July 30.

The JMA began monitoring on another tropical depression to the south of Japan on September 27. The system moved in a general northeastward direction until it was last noted on 18:00 UTC on September 29.

On October 7, the Vietnam Center for Hydro-Meteorological Forecasting (VNCHF) monitored a tropical depression that had made landfall in the Khánh Hòa province. Enhanced by the seasonal northeast monsoon, the system caused many provinces nearby to experience heavy rainfall with average accumulations of 200–300 mm. In Sa Huỳnh (Quảng Ngãi), rainfalls peaked at 360 mm. By October 11, heavy floods killed 9 people.

On December 5, a tropical depression formed to the south of Japan. The depression was short-lived, however, as it dissipated the next day after being embedded into a frontal zone.

On December 29, the JMA started to track a weak tropical depression to the east of Vietnam.

Storm names

Within the Northwest Pacific Ocean, both the Japan Meteorological Agency (JMA) and the Philippine Atmospheric, Geophysical and Astronomical Services Administration (PAGASA) assign names to tropical cyclones that develop in the Western Pacific, which can result in a tropical cyclone having two names. PAGASA assigns names to tropical cyclones which move into or form as a tropical depression in their area of responsibility located between 135°E and 115°E and between 5°N and 25°N even if the cyclone has had an international name assigned to it. The names of significant tropical cyclones are retired, by both PAGASA and the Typhoon Committee. Should the list of names for the Philippine region be exhausted then names will be taken from an auxiliary list of which the first ten are published each season.

International names

The JMA selected the names from a list of 140 names, that had been developed by the 14 members nations and territories of the ESCAP/WMO Typhoon Committee. During the season, the name Saudel was used for the first time after it replaced Soudelor, which was retired following the 2015 season.

Retirement 
After the season, the Typhoon Committee announced that the names Vongfong, Linfa, Molave, Goni, and Vamco would be removed from the naming lists. In 2022, they were replaced by Penha, Peilou, Narra, Gaenari and Bang-Lang respectively.

Philippines

During the season PAGASA used its own naming scheme for the 22 tropical cyclones, that either developed within or moved into their self-defined area of responsibility. The names were taken from a list of names, that had been last used during 2016 and are scheduled to be used again during 2024. The names Kristine, Leon, Nika, Pepito and Vicky were used for the first time after the names Karen, Lawin, Nina, Pablo and Violeta were retired.

Retirement 
After the season, PAGASA announced that the names Ambo, Quinta, Rolly and Ulysses will be removed from its rotating naming lists due to the number of deaths and amount of damage they caused, and they will not be used again. On January 21, 2021, they will be replaced with Aghon, Querubin, 
Romina and Upang for the 2024 season.

Season effects
This table summarizes all the systems that developed within or moved into the North Pacific Ocean, to the west of the International Date Line during 2020. The tables also provide an overview of a system's intensity, duration, land areas affected and any deaths or damages associated with the system.
|-
| Vongfong (Ambo) ||  || bgcolor=#| || bgcolor=#| || bgcolor=#| || Palau, Philippines, Taiwan ||  ||  || 
|-
| Nuri (Butchoy) ||  || bgcolor=#| || bgcolor=#| || bgcolor=#| || Philippines, South China ||  Unknown ||  || 
|-
| Carina ||  || bgcolor=#| || bgcolor=#| || bgcolor=#| || Philippines, Taiwan ||  Minimal ||  None||
|-
| TD ||  || bgcolor=#| || bgcolor=#| || bgcolor=#| || None ||  None ||  None ||
|-
| Hagupit (Dindo)  ||  || bgcolor=#| || bgcolor=#| || bgcolor=#| || Ryukyu Islands, Taiwan, East China, Korean Peninsula, Kamchatka Peninsula ||  ||  || 
|-
| Sinlaku  ||  || bgcolor=#| || bgcolor=#| || bgcolor=#| || South China, Vietnam, Laos, Thailand, Myanmar ||  ||  || 
|-
| Jangmi (Enteng) ||  || bgcolor=#| || bgcolor=#| || bgcolor=#| ||Philippines, Ryukyu Islands, Korean Peninsula||  ||  None || 
|-
| 06W (Gener) ||  || bgcolor=#| || bgcolor=#| || bgcolor=#| || Bonin Islands, Ryukyu Islands ||  None ||  None ||
|-
| Mekkhala (Ferdie) ||  || bgcolor=#| || bgcolor=#| || bgcolor=#| || Philippines, Taiwan, East China ||  ||  None || 
|-
| Higos (Helen) ||  || bgcolor=#| || bgcolor=#| || bgcolor=#| || Philippines, South China, Northern Vietnam  ||  ||  || 
|-
| Bavi (Igme) ||  || bgcolor=#| || bgcolor=#| || bgcolor=#| || Philippines, Ryukyu Islands, Taiwan, Korean Peninsula, North China ||  ||  || 
|-
| Maysak (Julian) ||  || bgcolor=#| || bgcolor=#| || bgcolor=#| || Philippines, Japan, Korean Peninsula, Northeast China ||  ||  || 
|-
| Haishen (Kristine) ||  || bgcolor=#| || bgcolor=#| || bgcolor=#| || Mariana Islands, Northeast China, Japan, Korean Peninsula ||  ||  || 
|-
| 12W ||  || bgcolor=#| || bgcolor=#| || bgcolor=#| || Japan ||  None ||  None ||
|-
| Noul (Leon)||  || bgcolor=#| || bgcolor=#| || bgcolor=#| || Laos, Thailand, Myanmar, Philippines, Vietnam ||  ||  || 
|-
| Dolphin (Marce) ||  || bgcolor=#| || bgcolor=#| || bgcolor=#| || None ||  None ||  None ||
|-
| Kujira ||  || bgcolor=#| || bgcolor=#| || bgcolor=#| || None ||  None ||  None ||
|-
| TD ||  || bgcolor=#| || bgcolor=#| || bgcolor=#| || None ||  None ||  None ||
|-
| Chan-hom ||  || bgcolor=#| || bgcolor=#| || bgcolor=#| || Japan ||  None ||  None ||
|-
| Linfa ||  || bgcolor=#| || bgcolor=#| || bgcolor=#| || Philippines, Vietnam, Cambodia, Laos, Thailand, Myanmar ||  ||  || 
|-
| Nangka (Nika) ||  || bgcolor=#| || bgcolor=#| || bgcolor=#| || Philippines, South China, Vietnam, Laos, Myanmar ||  ||  || 
|-
| Ofel ||  || bgcolor=#| || bgcolor=#| || bgcolor=#| || Philippines, Vietnam, Laos ||  ||   || 
|-
| Saudel (Pepito) ||  || bgcolor=#| || bgcolor=#| || bgcolor=#| || Philippines, South China, Vietnam ||  ||  None || 
|-
| 20W ||  || bgcolor=#| || bgcolor=#| || bgcolor=#| || None ||  None ||  None ||
|-
| Molave (Quinta) ||  || bgcolor=#| || bgcolor=#| || bgcolor=#| || Philippines, Spratly Island, Vietnam, Laos, Cambodia, Thailand, Malaysia ||  ||  || Vietnam November 2020 Report
|-
| Goni (Rolly) ||  || bgcolor=#| || bgcolor=#| || bgcolor=#| || Philippines, Vietnam, Cambodia, Laos ||  ||  || 
|-
| Atsani (Siony) ||  || bgcolor=#| || bgcolor=#| || bgcolor=#| || Mariana Islands, Philippines, Taiwan, South China ||  ||  None ||
|-
| Etau (Tonyo) ||  || bgcolor=#| || bgcolor=#| || bgcolor=#| || Philippines, Vietnam, Cambodia ||  ||  || 
|-
| Vamco (Ulysses) ||  || bgcolor=#| || bgcolor=#| || bgcolor=#| || Philippines, Vietnam, Laos, Thailand ||  ||  || 
|-
| TD ||  || bgcolor=#| || bgcolor=#| || bgcolor=#| || None ||  None ||  None ||
|-
| Krovanh (Vicky) ||  || bgcolor=#| || bgcolor=#| || bgcolor=#| || Philippines, Malaysia, Thailand ||  ||  || 
|-
| TD ||  || bgcolor=#| || bgcolor=#| || bgcolor=#| || None ||  None ||  None || 
|-

See also  

Weather of 2020
Tropical cyclones in 2020
Pacific typhoon season
 List of wettest tropical cyclones
 2020 Atlantic hurricane season
 2020 Pacific hurricane season
 2020 North Indian Ocean cyclone season
 South-West Indian Ocean cyclone seasons: 2019–20, 2020–21
 Australian region cyclone seasons: 2019–20, 2020–21
 South Pacific cyclone seasons: 2019–20, 2020–21

Notes

References

External links

 
Articles which contain graphical timelines
Pacific typhoon seasons
Tropical cyclones in 2020